The 1981–82 Scottish Cup was the 97th staging of Scotland's most prestigious football knockout competition. The Cup was won by Aberdeen who defeated Rangers in the final.

First round

Replays

Second round

Replays

Second Replay

Third round

Replays

Fourth round

Replay

Second Replay

Quarter-finals

Semi-finals

Replays

Final

Scottish Cup seasons
Scottish Cup, 1981-82
Scot